The Dick Institute is a museum and library in Kilmarnock, Scotland. It is an important cultural venue in the south-west of Scotland, featuring the largest museum and art gallery space in Ayrshire as well as the central library for East Ayrshire.

History of the building 
The Dick Institute was opened in 1901. The funds which were required to build the institute were provided by James' Dick, who lived in Australia but was born, in 1823, in Soulis Street, Kilmarnock. The building was severely damaged by fire only eight years after it opened. Some of the museum's collections were lost in the fire but it reopened in 1911 and was used as an auxiliary hospital in 1917 during World War I.

Present day 
The Dick Institute has a programme that includes nationally important exhibitions, permanent displays of the museum's own collections and work by contemporary artists, film makers and young people from the area, giving the Dick Institute a growing reputation for the quality and scope of its exhibitions and events. Previous major exhibitions have included Miffy, Quentin Blake, Wallace and Gromit, Cutting Edge, Radical Nature and Bill Viola.

Many of Scotland's leading contemporary artists including Kenny Hunter, Simon Ward and Christine Borland have been shown and creative commissioning programmes have supported artistic talent, by linking with major shows such as Ayrshire Innovators, Creative Burns and South By South West.
The South Museum and Loom Room feature stories of the local and social history of the area as well as a Johnnie Walker display featuring a selection of illustrations and objects from the company and from the institute's own collections.

The North Museum wing contains objects from the natural history sciences and archaeology collections which have been recently updated and refurbished to display more items, including some previously unseen by the public from the museum stores. The lending library, junior library, learning centre and cafe are all housed on the ground floor.
Full disabled access is available.

References

External links

East Ayrshire Leisure: The Dick Institute
Visit Scotland: The Dick Institute
Dick Institute on Canmore, Historic Environment Scotland.

1901 establishments in Scotland
Buildings and structures in Kilmarnock
Museums established in 1901
Museums in East Ayrshire